Nobleite is a rare borate mineral with the chemical formula  CaB6O9(OH)2·3H2O. It was discovered in 1961, in Death Valley, California, and is named for Levi F. Noble, a USGS geologist, in honor of his contributions to the geology of the Death Valley region.

Nobleite has also been identified at two localities in Chile and Argentina.

References

Webmineral
Mindata

Phylloborates
Monoclinic minerals
Minerals in space group 14